Hannah de Burgh Whyte (born 7 September 1991) is an Irish cricketer. She has been part of the Ireland Women's Performance Squad, and played her first and only Women's Twenty20 International (WT20I) for Ireland, against the Netherlands, on 15 August 2011. She played in the Women's Super Series for Scorchers.

References

External links

1991 births
Living people
Irish women cricketers
Ireland women Twenty20 International cricketers
Place of birth missing (living people)
Scorchers (women's cricket) cricketers